TMA-4 may be:
 TMA-4 mine
 Soyuz TMA-4, a Russian space exploration mission
 2,3,5-Trimethoxyamphetamine, a hallucinogenic drug